The Mollie Beattie Wilderness is located in the northeastern section of the Arctic National Wildlife Refuge. It is the second-largest designated wilderness area in the United States, after the Wrangell-Saint Elias Wilderness. Its territory is centered about a part of the Brooks Range that contains a combination of arctic, subarctic, and alpine ecosystems. Animal life is abundant, including that of large mammals such as brown bears, moose, caribou, musk oxen, and (offshore) polar bears and numerous species of whales and seals. The wilderness is named after conservationist Mollie Beattie, the first female director of the United States Fish and Wildlife Service.

See also
List of largest wilderness areas in the United States

References

External links
 Map of Mollie Beattie Wilderness Wilderness.net

Protected areas of North Slope Borough, Alaska
Wilderness areas of Alaska
Protected areas of Yukon–Koyukuk Census Area, Alaska
Brooks Range